The Webster–Hayne debate was a debate in the United States between Senator Daniel Webster of Massachusetts and Senator Robert Y. Hayne of South Carolina that took place on January 19–27, 1830 on the topic of protectionist tariffs. The heated speeches were unplanned and stemmed from the debate over a resolution by Connecticut Senator Samuel A. Foot calling for the temporary suspension of further land surveying until land already on the market was sold (to effectively stop the introduction of new lands onto the market). Webster's "Second Reply to Hayne" was generally regarded as "the most eloquent speech ever delivered in Congress."

Webster's description of the U.S. government as "made for the people, made by the people, and answerable to the people," was later paraphrased by Abraham Lincoln in the Gettysburg Address in the words "government of the people, by the people, for the people."  The speech is also known for the line Liberty and union, now and forever, one and inseparable, which would subsequently become the state motto of North Dakota, appearing on the state seal.

Analysis
Massachusetts Senator Daniel Webster's "Second Reply" to South Carolina Senator Robert Y. Hayne has long been thought of as a great oratorical celebration of American Nationalism in a period of sectional conflict. The 1830 Webster–Hayne debate centered around the South Carolina nullification crisis of the late 1820s, but historians have largely ignored the sectional interests underpinning Webster's argument on behalf of Unionism and a transcendent nationalism. In many respects, his speech betrays the mentality of Massachusetts conservatives seeking to regain national leadership and advance their particular ideas about the nation. Webster realized that if the social, political, and economic elite of Massachusetts and the Northeast were to once again lay claim to national leadership, he had to justify New England's previous history of sectionalism within a framework of nationalistic progression. Though Webster made an impassioned argument, the political, social, and economic traditions of New England informed his ideas about the threatened nation. Even more pointedly, his speech reflected a decade of arguments from other Massachusetts conservatives who argued against supposed threats to New England's social order.

Schouler's analysis

References

External links
 The Hayne-Webster Debate

Great Triumvirate
United States public land law
Political debates
1830 in American politics
Daniel Webster